Gerardus de Vet (born 15 Nov 1917 in Gilze) was a Dutch clergyman and bishop for the Roman Catholic Diocese of Breda. He was ordained in 1943. He was appointed in 1962. He died in 1967.

References 

Dutch Roman Catholic bishops
1917 births
1967 deaths